The Great Scottish Run is a series of mass-participation road running events, held annually in the streets of Glasgow, Scotland in October.  The event began as a full marathon in 1979, but later changed to a weekend of shorter events. The weekend now includes short events for children, a 10K roadrace, and a half marathon.  The 2013 event, which was sponsored by the Bank of Scotland, featured over 30,000 competitors. It is the largest mass-participation sporting event in Scotland.

History
A Glasgow road-race began in 1979 as the Glasgow Marathon, and was run over the full marathon distance, over four loops around the centre of the city. This initial event set the challenging qualifying standard of 3 hours, which limited participation to 62 runners in the first year and 144 in the second. The third year dropped the qualifying standard and encouraged mass participation, with over 7,000 runners competing in the first Scottish People's Marathon. The race continued over this distance until 1988 when, faced with diminishing participation and little engagement from TV and sponsors, the event was run over a half-marathon course. This unusual distance proved unpopular with the elite athletes who the organisers had hoped to attract, and so two years later the race returned to the half marathon format.

After the running of the 2016 event, a number of runners raised concerns that their GPS watches reported the route was shorter than the prescribed distance. The race organisers, The Great Run Company, later confirmed that the course was  too short; the inaccuracy came from both a setup error in one section and errors measuring the route when roads (which are closed to traffic during the race) were in normal operation. The 2016 men's event winner, Callum Hawkins, had broken the Scottish half marathon record, but the non-regulation distance invalidates this record.

Course

Half marathon course
The half marathon begins in George Square and immediately heads steeply up St. Vincent Street, going west through the city's commercial centre and Anderston. Runners then join a sliproad of the M8 motorway and cross the River Clyde on the Kingston Bridge, part of which is closed to vehicle traffic for the Sunday morning of the event. The next portion of the race takes place in the city's south side, heading through streets of the Kinning Park area, and then on paths through Bellahouston Park and heading back northeast toward Pacific Quay and the river. The course then crosses the Clyde again, this time on the Clyde Arc. From there runners head west along the river side, past the Scottish Exhibition and Conference Centre before doubling back around the Riverside Museum to head east along the Clyde, and back through Anderston, with runners entering Glasgow Green through the McLennan Arch for the finish.

The route was changed for the 2013 running – in previous races, runners stayed on the south side after Bellahouston Park, looping through Pollok Country Park and the streets of Pollokshaws and the Gorbals, and only crossing the Clyde again, on the Alexandra Bridge, just before the entrance to Glasgow Green.

10K course
The 10K course follows the same route as the half marathon for the first , but instead of crossing the Kingston Bridge, runners head west through Anderston and around the Riverside Museum (a section near the end of the half marathon course). The course then crosses the Clyde on the Clyde Arc bridge, loops very briefly through Pacific Quay, and then immediately back over the Clyde Arc. From there it follows the half marathon course along the river's north bank to Glasgow Green.

As with the half marathon, the 10K course was adjusted in 2013 to include Finnieston and the SECC area. In previous runnings, the 10K crossed the Clyde on the Kingston Bridge and followed an abbreviated path from Scotland Street, through Pollokshields before crossing the Clyde on Victoria Bridge and entering Glasgow Green.

Winners

Half marathon winners

Male
1991 – 1:04:23 -  Dave Lewis
1992 – 1:04:03 -  Turube Bedaso
1993 – 1:01:56 -  Mark Flint
1994 – 1:02:53 -  Joseph Kamau
1995 – 1:02:46 -  Samson Maritim
1996 – 1:02:27 -  Joseph Kibor
1997 – 1:01:46 -  Joseph Kibor
1998 – 1:03:00 -  Armando Quintanilla
1999 – 1:02:36 -  Joseph Kibor
2000 – 1:02:04 -  António Pinto
2001 – 1:03:23 -  Abner Chipu
2002 – 1:03:15 -  Sammy Kipruto
2003 – 1:01:49 -  Peter Kiprotich
2004 – 1:01:48.2 -  Peter Kiprotich
2005 – 1:03:02.5 -  Jason Mbote
2006 – 1:01:36 -  Jason Mbote
2007 – 1:02:42 -  Isaac Wanjohi
2008 – 1:01:10 -  Emmanuel Mutai
2009 – 1:01:19 -  Jason Mbote
2010 – 1:01:53 -  Hailu Mekonnen
2011 – 1:01:26 -  Joseph Birech
2012 – 1:03:14 -  Joseph Birech
2013 – 1:01:09 -  Haile Gebrselassie
2014 – 1:01:25 -  Stephen Mokoka
2015 – 1:02:18 -  Moses Kipsiro
2016 – 1:00:24 -  Callum Hawkins
2017 – 1:02:44 -  Chris Thompson
2018 – 1:02:07 -  Chris Thompson
2019 – 1:01:29 -  Timothy Toroitich

Female
1991 –  Andrea Wallace
1992 –  Liz McColgan
1993 –  Tatiana Pozdniakova
1994 –  Alevtina Naumova
1995 –  Firiya Sultanova
1996 –  Firiya Sultanova
1997 –  Catherina McKiernan
1998 –  Firiya Sultanova
1999 –  Joyce Chepchumba
2000 –  Joyce Chepchumba
2001 –  Joyce Chepchumba
2002 –  Joyce Chepchumba
2003 –  Caroline Kwambai
2004 –  Beatrice Omwanza
2005 –  Hiroko Miyauchi
2006 –  Caroline Kilel
2007 –  Peninah Arusei
2008 –  Worknesh Tola
2009 –  Caroline Kilel
2010 –  Caroline Kilel
2011 –  Flomena Chepchirchir
2012 –  Bezunesh Bekele
2013 –  Susan Partridge
2014 –  Edna Kiplagat
2015 –  Edna Kiplagat
2016 – 1:07:22 –  Betsy Saina
2017 – 1:10:17 –  Flomena Cheyech Daniel
2018 – 1:09:15 –  Mare Dibaba
2019 – 1:07:38 –  Edith Chelimo

Wheelchair half marathon winners

Male
2005 –  Kenny Herriot
2008 – Mark Telford
2011 – Ross Low
2012 – Phil Hogg
2014 – Simon Lawson

Female
2005 –  Tanni Grey-Thompson
2008 – Margo Whiteford
2011 – Jane Egan
2012 –  Meggan Dawson-Farrell

Notes and references

Notes

References

External links
 Photo of runners on Kingston Bridge, STV (Scottish Television) website, September 2010
 Photo of 1982 Glasgow People's Marathon medal, A History of the World, BBC website

Half marathons in the United Kingdom
Athletics competitions in Scotland
International sports competitions in Glasgow
Road running in Scotland
1979 establishments in Scotland
Recurring sporting events established in 1979
Annual events in Glasgow
Annual sporting events in the United Kingdom
Glasgow Green